Buchi Babu is a 1980 Indian Telugu-language comedy film, produced by Venkat Akkineni, Nagarjuna Akkineni under the Annapurna Studios banner, and directed by Dasari Narayana Rao. It stars Akkineni Nageswara Rao and Jaya Prada, with music composed by Chakravarthy.

Plot
Buchi Babu (Akkineni Nageswara Rao) marries his maternal uncle Varahala Rao's (Raavi Kondala Rao) daughter Buchi (Jayaprada) in their childhood. At that time, Buchi Babu's parents (Prabhakar Reddy and Pushpalata) are needy in their in-laws (Gummadi and Nirmalamma) house. Gundabathula Achchamma (Suryakantham) maternal aunt to Buchi Babu, a shrew opposes this match, insults them badly and throws out the wedding chain from Buchi's neck. So, Buchi Babu has to leave their house along with his parents and safeguards the wedding chain. Years roll by, Buchi Babu's family becomes wealthy thereupon Varahala Rao arrives, explains them the present situation that Achchamma has destroyed the happiness in the family, made the children as spoil brats and also suffers her in-laws. Now to reform them Buchi Babu enters their house in disguise as a cook by the name Maryada Ramanna. Rest of the story is a comic tale that how Buchi Babu teaches them a lesson, acquires Buchi's love and set rights the entire family.

Cast

Akkineni Nageswara Rao as Buchi Babu / Maryada Ramanna
Jaya Prada as Buchi
Mohan Babu as V. P. Rao
Dasari Narayana Rao as Buthula Bapaiah
Gummadi as Buchi Babu's grandfather 
Prabhakar Reddy as Buchi Babu's father 
Murali Mohan in a cameo appearance
Raja Babu as Buthula Bapaiah's son
Chalam as Driver Seetapati
Raavi Kondala Rao as Varahala Rao 
K. V. Chalam as Jayapapa's husband 
Chalapathi Rao as Geetha's father 
Raja as Rambabu
Suryakantam as Gundabathula Achchamma
Pushpalata as Santha
Sujatha in a Cameo appearance
Rama Prabha as Hema 
Geetha as Geetha 
Athili Lakshmi as Jayapapa
Dubbing Janaki as Geetha's mother 
Nirmalamma as Buchi Babu's grandmother 
Master Harish as young Buchi Babu 
Baby Tulasi as young Buchi

Crew
Art: Bhaskar Raju
Choreography: Saleem
Stills: Mohanji - Jaganji
Playback:  S. P. Balasubrahmanyam, P. Susheela, S. P. Sailaja, Madhavapeddi Ramesh, Ramana, Pushpalata
Music: Chakravarthy
Editing: K. Balu
Cinematography: P. S. Selvaraj
Producer: Venkat Akkineni, Nagarjuna Akkineni
Story - Screenplay - Dialogues - Lyrics - Director: Dasari Narayana Rao 
Banner: Annapurna Studios
Release Date: 19 March 1980

Soundtrack

Music composed by Chakravarthy. Lyrics were written by Dasari Narayana Rao. Music released on SEA Records Audio Company.

Others
 VCDs and DVDs on — VOLGA Videos, Hyderabad

References

External links
 

Indian comedy films
Films scored by K. Chakravarthy
Films directed by Dasari Narayana Rao
1980s Telugu-language films
1980 comedy films
1980 films